Dr. Emmanuel Eweta Uduaghan (born 22 October 1954) is a retired Nigerian politician and doctor who served as Governor of Delta State from 2007 to 2015. He assumed office via an inconclusive election on 29 May 2007 and was a member of the People's Democratic Party (PDP). He was reelected in 2011.

A medical doctor by profession, prior to becoming governor, he was the Commissioner for Health, Delta State and the Secretary to the State Government.

Background

Emmanuel Eweta Uduaghan was born on 22 October 1954 in Warri North Local Government Area in Delta State of Itsekiri origin. He attended Federal Government College, Warri (1968–1974), and the University of Benin (1975–1980) earning a Bachelor of Medicine and Surgery (MBBS) degree, and a Diploma in Anaesthesia. He is married, with two children.

Emmanuel Uduaghan began work in 1983 at the Delta Steel Company, as a medical officer. From 1989 to 1994, he worked in a number of hospitals including Westend Hospital, Warri; Benoni Hospitals, Benin City and Shell Hospital, Ogunu, where he was a consultant anaesthesiologist. In 1994 he set up a private medical practice.
He has held various positions in the Nigerian Medical Association in Warri, Bendel State and Delta State.
He was also active in the Junior Chamber International (Jaycees) leadership development organization.

Political career

Emmanuel Uduaghan was a founding member and chairman of the All Nigeria Congress Association for the Warri South Local Government Area, a founder and executive member of the Grassroots Democratic Movement (GDM), and a foundation member of the PDP.

On 6 August 1999, the Governor of Delta State James Onanefe Ibori appointed Emmanuel Uduaghan as Commissioner for Health, Delta State. In this position he improved the pay of medical staff and upgraded infrastructure.
On 6 June 2003, Uduaghan was appointed Secretary to the Delta State Government.
In November 2008, Uduaghan and State Chief Justice Rosaline Bozimo approved establishment of sanitation mobile courts to prosecute sanitation offenders in the State.

Uduaghan ran again for governor in the 26 April 2011 elections, and was reelected. He gained 525,793 votes, while Chief Great Ogboru of the Democratic People's Party (DPP) was the runner-up with 433,834 votes. 

On 29 August 2018 he officially announced he has left PDP for APC. However, in 2020, he returned to the PDP. In 2022, he announced his retirement from politics.

Personal lie 
His wife, Roli, is the daughter of Brig. General Sunny E. Tuoyo (Rtd), a one time Military Administrator of Ondo State.

See also
List of Governors of Delta State

References

1954 births
Living people
People from Delta State
Itsekiri people
Peoples Democratic Party state governors of Nigeria
Governors of Delta State
Delta State politicians
University of Benin (Nigeria) alumni
Secretaries to the State Government